José María Vallés y Ribot (18 July 1849 – 1911), in Catalan Josep Maria Vallès i Ribot, was a Spanish republican politician who served as legislator in the Congress of Deputies a number of times during the Restoration period between 1891 and 1910, and previously during the First Spanish Republic between 1873 and 1874.

References

1849 births
1911 deaths